Robert Wickliffe Woolley (April 29, 1871 – December 15, 1958) was an American Democratic politician from Washington D.C.  He was Director of the United States Mint from 1915 to 1916, and a member of the Interstate Commerce Commission in 1920. He was a critic of American fuel consumption.

Biography
He was born on April 29, 1871 in Lexington, Kentucky to Franklin Waters Woolley (1845–1891) and the former Lucy McCaw (1844–1905). He married Marguerite Holmes Trenholm (1878–1936) in 1900 and had four daughters, Marguerite Trenholm Woolley (1901–1983), Lucy DeGraffenried (Woolley) List (1902–1993), Florence Trenholm Wickliffe (Woolley) McKee (1905–1997) and Frances Howard (Wolley) Robb (1914–2003). Frances was the mother of future governor of Virginia Charles S. Robb and mother-in-law of future first lady Lynda Bird Johnson Robb.

He was Director of the United States Mint from 1915 to 1916.

During President Wilson's 1916 reelection bid, Woolley was the chairman of the Bureau of Publicity for the Democratic National Committee and was credited with the successful slogan "He Has Kept Us Out of the War."

He was a member of the Interstate Commerce Commission in 1920.

He died on December 15, 1958 in Frankfort, Kentucky.

References

External links

 

Washington, D.C., Democrats
People of the Interstate Commerce Commission
Directors of the United States Mint
1871 births
1958 deaths
People from Lexington, Kentucky
Woodrow Wilson administration personnel